XEEMM-AM is a radio station on 810 kHz in Salamanca, Guanajuato. Owned by Radio Grupo Antonio Contreras, XEEMM is known as Salmantina.

History
The original XEEMM concession was awarded to Enrique Mejía Mendez on November 8, 1983. XEEMM operated as a 250-watt daytimer on 1210 kHz. Contreras became the concessionaire in 1993, and XEEMM moved to 810 with 4 kW day and 250 watts night later in the 90s.

References

Radio stations in Guanajuato